Leah Marie O'Brien-Amico (born September 9, 1974) is an American, former collegiate All-American, three-time Olympian, left-handed-hitting softball outfielder and sports commentator originally from Chino, California. O'Brien-Amico is best known for playing for the Arizona Wildcats (1993–1997, winning three National Championships) and earning gold medals at the 1996, 2000 and 2004 Olympics. She is a USA Softball Hall of Fame honoree.

Arizona Wildcats
Born in Garden Grove, California, O'Brien-Amico graduated from Don Lugo High School in nearby Chino in 1992 and attended the University of Arizona. Playing for the Arizona Wildcats softball team, she was named to the First Team All-Pac-10 for her freshman efforts. At the 1993 Women's College World Series, the Wildcats faced rival UCLA in the finale and with the only hit allowed, she drove in the game-winning run off Lisa Fernandez. It was Arizona's second title.

O'Brien-Amico earned First Team All-American honors to accompany conference honors. It was Arizona's second title. Her 16 doubles were the second best total and still rank top-10 for the Wildcats.

Returning to defend their title at the WCWS, O'Brien-Amico hit .750 (9/12 with 5 RBIs, a home run and two doubles) to set the tournament record for batting average. Eventually the Wildcats were able to successfully defend their title, besting the Cal State Northridge Matadors on May 30, 1994. O'Brien-Amico was perfect at the plate (3/3) and scored two runs against pitchers Jennifer Richardson and Amy Windmiller to be named All-Tournament.

For her junior year after red-shirting for the Atlanta Olympics, O'Brien-Amico earned all-season honors for a third straight year.  She broke the school record for doubles and her 101 hits was a top-5 record. She still ranks top-10 all-time in both categories.

With her third straight appearance in the WCWS finals, O'Brien-Amico and the Wildcats again faced the UCLA Bruins but were defeated 4-2 on May 29, 1995. O'Brien-Amico went 2/3 with an RBI and was again named All-Tournament. The title was later vacated by the NCAA due to rules violations.

She earned her final First Team All-American and All-Pac-10 honors. With a career best .467 average, O'Brien-Amico collected 99 hits to rank top-5 for both stats and remains in the top-10 all-time for the Wildcats.

Concluding her finals streak at the WCWS, O'Brien-Amico won her third National Championship over the UCLA Bruins and was a perfect 2/2 with two RBIs and two walks against hurler Christa Williams. She also scored two of Arizona's 10 runs in the mercy rule victory. She was named to the All-Tournament Team for a third series.

With combined stats from previous seasons, O'Brien-Amico had a WCWS career of .563 (31/55) with 19 RBIs, two home runs, 4 doubles and 7 walks, striking out just once with a slugging percentage of .745%. She also hit safely in 17 of 18 games, being shut out just once by Melanie Roche and the Oklahoma State Cowgirls on May 30, 1993. Beginning the next game of that doubleheader day with the ULL Ragin' Cajuns, O'Brien-Amico went on a 15-consecutive-game hit streak ending with her title in 1997.

O'Brien-Amico graduated atop the list for the Arizona Wildcats in career average and doubles. She also ranked top-10 for hits in the NCAA and still does at Arizona for her average and doubles.

Team USA
For the Athens Olympics, O'Brien-Amico was the only collegiate athlete selected to the roster and hit .300 in 7 games and was perfect at right field. To open her Olympics career, O'Brien-Amico went 2/3 with a walk in a 10–0 mercy-rule win over Puerto Rico. She did not play the gold medal game.

At the 2000 Sydney Olympics she hit under .250 for the tournament. O'Brien-Amico nabbed hits in games with Italy, Japan, China and Australia running September 23–25, 2000. She drove in her only RBIs in a 6-0 win over Italy and in the gold medal game was shut out by Japan, though Team USA won 2-1 on September 26.

On the "Aiming For Athens" Tour, O'Brien-Amico hit .386 with 43 RBIs, 5 home runs and 9 doubles. Facing the Stanford Cardinal on February 20, 2004, O'Brien had a tour-high 3 RBIs on a home run to eventually win 9–0. In the Olympics, O'Brien-Amico had a tournament-best 2 RBIs off Melanie Roche of Australia on August 15; the US eventually won 10-0 run-ruling the Australians. She would equal her performance vs. Greece on August 19.

In the August 23 gold medal game, O'Brien-Amico had a single as the United States defeated Australia 5-1 to close out their dominating tournament in victory. She hit .200 for her final international tournament.

Personal life
She is the daughter of Frederick G. O'Brien and Denise M. Lynch. In 2002, O'Brien-Amico was inducted into the University of Arizona Hall of Fame. She now lives in California with her husband Tommy and three children. She currently works in the ministry and occasionally offers color commentary for ESPN.

Statistics

University of Arizona

Team USA

Awards and honors
 Three-time NFCA First-Team All-American (1994, 1995 and 1997)
 WCWS National Champion (1993, 1994 and 1997)
 3-Time Academic All American
 3-Time First-team All-Pacific Region
 4-Time All-Pac-10
 3-time ASA All-American
 1996 Atlanta Olympics Gold Medalist
 1997 NCAA "Woman of the Year" (State of Arizona)
 1998 ISF World Championships Gold Medalist
 1999 Pan American Games Gold Medalist
 2000 Sydney Olympics Gold Medalist
 2002 University of Arizona Hall of Fame
 2002 ISF World Championships Gold Medalist
 2003 Pan American Games Gold Medalist
 2004 Athens Olympics Gold Medalist

See also
 NCAA Division I softball career .400 batting average list

References

External links
 
 Player profile

 https://web.archive.org/web/20120512214410/http://www.leah20.com/index.asp
 https://web.archive.org/web/20120923065626/http://www.arizonawildcats.com/sports/w-softbl/ariz-w-softbl-body.html

1974 births
Living people
Softball players from California
Arizona Wildcats softball players
Olympic softball players of the United States
Softball players at the 1996 Summer Olympics
Softball players at the 2000 Summer Olympics
Softball players at the 2004 Summer Olympics
Olympic gold medalists for the United States in softball
People from Chino, California
People from Garden Grove, California
Medalists at the 2004 Summer Olympics
Medalists at the 2000 Summer Olympics
Medalists at the 1996 Summer Olympics
Sportspeople from Orange County, California
Sportspeople from San Bernardino County, California